Sarcosine dehydrogenase, mitochondrial is an enzyme that in humans is encoded by the SARDH gene.

References

Further reading